Halgodari-ye Osman (also Romanized as Halgodāri-ye ʿOs̄mān; also known as Khalaqdāri-ye ʿOs̄mān) is a village in Negur Rural District, Dashtiari District, Chabahar County, Sistan and Baluchestan Province, Iran. At the 2006 census, its population was 110, in 19 families.

References 

Populated places in Chabahar County